Carolus is a genus in the Malpighiaceae, a family of about 75 genera of flowering plants in the order Malpighiales. Carolus comprises six species of woody vines native to Mexico, Central America, the Lesser Antilles, and South America.

External links and reference
Malpighiaceae Malpighiaceae - description, taxonomy, phylogeny, and nomenclature
Carolus
Anderson, W. R. 2006. Eight segregates from the neotropical genus Mascagnia (Malpighiaceae). Novon 16: 168–204.

Malpighiaceae
Malpighiaceae genera